Theo Stockman (born December 27, 1984) is an American actor and singer, known for his roles in Broadway musicals such as Hair, American Idiot, and American Psycho, numerous roles on television including Inside Amy Schumer, High Maintenance, Private Practice, The Following, Shades of Blue, Law & Order: SVU, and for his role in Stephen King's A Good Marriage. He plays Josh on Netflix's Bonding and Jacob on Apple TV's “WeCrashed”.

Early life
Stockman is the son of author Jayne Anne Phillips and physician Mark Stockman. He graduated from Concord Academy in 2003. While there, he was an active member of the theatre program, performing as Nick Bottom in A Midsummer Night's Dream and multiple characters in The Laramie Project. In his senior year of high school, Stockman adapted The Perks of Being a Wallflower for the stage and directed it as part of the academy's Directors Seminar.

Stockman graduated from New York University's Tisch School of the Arts with a Bachelor of Fine Arts in drama in 2007, after studying at the Stella Adler Studio of Acting, the Experimental Theatre Wing, and the International Theatre Workshop in Amsterdam. He portrayed Claude Bukowski in a "no hair" production of the musical Hair, where all cast members sported shaved heads. In 2007, Stockman played Dionysus in The Bacchae at the International Theatre Festival in Warsaw, for which he was awarded Best Lead Actor.

Career
Stockman was an original cast member in the Tony Award-winning 2009 Broadway revival of Hair, performing as a Member of the Tribe and as the characters Hubert, the Nazi Principal, and John Wilkes Booth. He performed in the 40th anniversary concert production at the Delacorte Theater, followed by the revival at the Delacorte Theater in Central Park. He then transferred with the show to Broadway.

Stockman then starred as The Representative of Jingletown in American Idiot on Broadway, after appearing in workshops and the original Berkeley run. American Idiot premiered at the Berkeley Repertory Theatre on September 4, 2009, and transferred to the St. James Theatre on Broadway, where it opened on April 20, 2010. Stockman left the show on January 30, 2011.

In 2012, Stockman starred as Danny Mueller in the Off-Broadway play An Early History of Fire by David Rabe, produced by The New Group.

In June 2013, he joined the cast of Peter Askin's film adaptation of Stephen King's novella A Good Marriage, portraying Donnie Anderson.

Stockman returned to Broadway in 2016, playing the role of Timothy Price in the musical "American Psycho,” written by Duncan Sheik and Roberto Aguirre-Sacasa.

Stockman starred as Steve Rubell in “This Ain’t No Disco” at the Atlantic Theater Company, written by Stephen Trask (Hedwig and the Angry Inch) and Peter Yanowitz (The Wallflowers). The world premiere musical ran Off-Broadway, summer 2018. He recently starred as the villainous Ashby Givens in the world premiere 2022 musical Black No More at The New Group, written by Black Thought and John Ridley.

Stockman plays Pete's boyfriend Josh in both seasons of the Netflix original series “Bonding”, written & directed by Rightor Doyle.

Most recently, he can be seen as the recurring character of Jacob on Apple TV+’s “WeCrashed,” opposite Jared Leto and Anne Hathaway. Theo also plays Ezra Fisher in “Alaska Daily” on ABC, starring Hilary Swank.”

Filmography

Film

Television

Stage

References

External links
 
 
 

1984 births
21st-century American male actors
American male film actors
American male musical theatre actors
Living people
Male actors from Massachusetts
People from Brookline, Massachusetts
Singers from Massachusetts
Tisch School of the Arts alumni
Concord Academy alumni